The Irish Greyhound Derby held at Shelbourne Park, is the premier greyhound racing competition in Ireland.

First held at Harold's Cross in 1928, the event was unofficial until 1932 and called the National Derby. The first winner in 1928 was Tipperary Hills who won in a time of 30.56 sec at a starting price of 1-1f.

It controversially switched to Shelbourne Park in 1932 and then it was held in alternate years between the two tracks.

The defunct Markets Field Greyhound Stadium in Limerick and the defunct Cork Greyhound Stadium in Western Road both hosted the event once in 1939 and 1942 respectively. The 1969 Irish Greyhound Derby was the last renewal held at Harold's Cross and the competition remained at Shelbourne Park from 1970. The most successful greyhound has been Spanish Battleship who won the event three times.

Today it is considered to be one of the two biggest races in the calendar by the UK & Ireland greyhound racing industries, alongside the English Greyhound Derby.

Venues and distances
Harolds Cross (1928–1931, then alternate years until 1967)
Limerick (1939)
Cork (1942)   
Shelbourne Park (1932, then alternate years until 1967)
Shelbourne Park (1968–1985, 525 yards)
Shelbourne Park (1986–present, 550 yards)

Past winners

+ Syndicate

Statistics

References

 
Recurring sporting events established in 1928
Greyhound racing competitions in Ireland
1928 establishments in Ireland
Greyhound racing competitions in Dublin (city)
Greyhound racing in Dublin (city)